
In Greek mythology, Ichnaea (Ikhnaia), "the tracker" was an epithet that could be applied to Themis, as in the Homeric Hymn to Delian Apollo, or to Nemesis, who was venerated at Ichnae, a Greek city in Macedon.

Mythology 
At the birth of Apollo on Delos according to the Homeric hymn, the goddesses   who bear witness to the rightness of the birth are the great goddesses of the old order: Dione, Rhea, the Ichnaean goddess, Themis, and the sea-goddess "loud-moaning" Amphitrite. While, Strabo, in his Geographica, says that the "Ichnaean Themis" is worshipped at the town of Ichnae, and William Smith suggests that the name "may have been derived" from the town.

Lycophron wrote of her "A doer of justice and arbiter of the Sun's daughter Ichnaea".

See also 
 Dike
 Astraea
 Lady Justice

Notes

References 
 Gantz, Timothy, Early Greek Myth: A Guide to Literary and Artistic Sources, Johns Hopkins University Press, 1996, Two volumes:  (Vol. 1),  (Vol. 2).
 Homeric Hymn 3 to Apollo, in The Homeric Hymns and Homerica with an English Translation by Hugh G. Evelyn-White, Cambridge, Massachusetts, Harvard University Press; London, William Heinemann Ltd. 1914. Online version at the Perseus Digital Library.
 Smith, William, Dictionary of Greek and Roman Biography and Mythology, London (1873). Online version at the Perseus Digital Library.
 Strabo,  Geography, edited and translated by H.C. Hamilton, Esq., W. Falconer, M.A., London, George Bell & Sons, 1903. Online version at the Perseus Digital Library.
 Strabo, Geography, Volume IV: Books 8-9, translated by Horace Leonard Jones, Loeb Classical Library No. 196, Cambridge, Massachusetts, Harvard University Press, 1927. . Online version at Harvard University Press. Online version by Bill Thayer. Online version at the Perseus Digital Library.
 Lycophron, Alexandra (or Cassandra) in Callimachus and Lycophron with an English translation by A. W. Mair; Aratus, with an English translation by G. R. Mair, London: W. Heinemann, New York: G. P. Putnam 1921.

External links 
 ICHNAEA from The Theoi Project

Epithets of Greek deities
Children of Helios